Grethel is an unincorporated community located in Floyd County, Kentucky, United States.

A post office was established in the community in 1921, and named for the first postmaster's daughter.

References

Unincorporated communities in Floyd County, Kentucky
Unincorporated communities in Kentucky